Zeyt may refer to:
 Zeyt, Azerbaijan
 Zeyt-e Olya, Iran
 Zeyt-e Sofla, Iran